The 2020 Indiana gubernatorial election was won by incumbent Republican Eric Holcomb on November 3, 2020. The election was held concurrently with the 2020 U.S. presidential election, as well as elections to the United States House of Representatives and various state and local elections.

Holcomb was eligible to run for re-election to a second term in office, and announced his intention to do so on July 13, 2019 alongside his lieutenant governor, Suzanne Crouch. He faced Democrat Woody Myers, the former health commissioner of Indiana (and later, of New York City) and his running mate, Linda Lawson, the former minority leader of the Indiana House of Representatives, in addition to Libertarian Donald Rainwater, a U.S. Navy veteran and his running mate William Henry. Primary elections were held on June 2; Holcomb and Myers ran unopposed.

In the general election, Holcomb won re-election to a second term. Myers also became the first major party candidate to receive fewer than one million votes since Republican David McIntosh in 2000. The election was also notable for the strong performance of Libertarian candidate Rainwater, who finished in second place, behind Holcomb and ahead of Myers, in over one-third of Indiana's counties, thirty three of ninety-two. The stronger-than-expected performance by Rainwater was perceived to be a reaction to Governor Holcomb's response to the COVID-19 pandemic, with Rainwater pushing for fewer government restrictions.

The Associated Press’s large-scale pre-election survey found that Eric Holcomb won white Hoosiers 62–27%, while Myers won black Hoosiers 76–20%.

This election marked the worst performance by a Democratic candidate for Governor in Indiana history.

Republican primary

Candidates

Nominee
Eric Holcomb, incumbent Governor of Indiana
Running mate: Suzanne Crouch, incumbent Lieutenant Governor

Removed from ballot
Brian Roth, businessman

Declined
Curtis Hill, Attorney General of Indiana (running for re-election)

Results

Democratic primary

Candidates

Nominee
Woody Myers, business executive and former Indiana Health Commissioner and New York City Health Commissioner
Running mate: Linda Lawson, former Minority Leader of the Indiana House of Representatives

Withdrew
Eddie Melton, state senator from the 3rd district
Josh Owens, businessman, former chairman of the Indiana Charter School Board, and former Luke Messer congressional staffer (endorsed Myers)

Declined
Pete Buttigieg, former mayor of South Bend and former 2020 presidential candidate
Joe Donnelly, former U.S. Senator
Greg Goodnight, former mayor of Kokomo
John R. Gregg, former speaker of the Indiana House of Representatives, former state representative from the 45th district, and Democratic nominee for governor in 2012 and 2016
Christina Hale, state representative from the 87th district and nominee for Lieutenant Governor in 2016 (running for Indiana's 5th Congressional district)
Baron Hill, former U.S. Representative from Indiana's 9th congressional district (endorsed Myers)
Joe Hogsett, mayor of Indianapolis
Karlee Macer, state representative from the 92nd district 
Thomas McDermott Jr., mayor of Hammond (running for Indiana's 1st congressional district)
Jonathan Weinzapfel, former mayor of Evansville (running for Attorney General)

Results

Libertarian convention

Candidates

Nominee
 Donald Rainwater, U.S. Navy veteran and Libertarian candidate for Indiana State Senate in 2016 & for Indiana House of Representatives in 2018
Running mate: William Henry

Eliminated at convention
 Bill Levin, Grand Poobah of the First Church of Cannabis of Indianapolis

General election

Predictions

Endorsements

Polling

Graphical summary

Results
Holcomb won reelection by over 24 percentage points, the biggest margin of victory for an Indiana gubernatorial candidate since Evan Bayh in 1992 as well as the biggest ever for a Republican. Exit polls show Holcomb won over 30% of voters who voted for Democrat Joe Biden for president. This is also one of the strongest performances for a third party candidate in a statewide election in Indiana, with Libertarian nominee Donald Rainwater receiving over 11% of the total vote. Rainwater outperformed Myers in several counties; his best performance was in Putnam County, where he received nearly 26% of the vote.

Results by county

Counties that flipped from Democratic to Republican
Delaware (largest municipality: Muncie)
Knox (largest municipality: Vincennes)
LaPorte (largest municipality: Michigan City)
Perry (largest municipality: Tell City)
Porter (largest municipality: Portage)
St. Joseph (largest municipality: South Bend)
Sullivan (largest municipality: Sullivan)
Tippecanoe (largest municipality: Lafayette)
Vermillion (largest municipality: Clinton)
Vigo (largest municipality: Terre Haute)

Notes

 Partisan clients

References

External links
Official campaign websites
 Eric Holcomb (R) for Governor
 Woody Myers (D) for Governor
 Donald Rainwater (L) for Governor

2020
Governor
Indiana